Adawá Mokanga (born 19 October 1988) is an Angolan international footballer who plays as a midfielder.

Career
Adawá has formerly played for Académica Soyo and Benfica de Luanda.

He made his international debut for Angola in 2010.

References

1988 births
Living people
Angolan footballers
Angola international footballers
2011 African Nations Championship players
Association football midfielders
Angola A' international footballers